Apple Blossoms is a 1919 Broadway musical with a book and lyrics by William LeBaron. It opened at the Globe Theatre on October 7, 1919, and closed on April 24, 1920, after 256 performances. The show is an adaptation of the book Un Marriage sous Louis XV by Alexander Dumas.

Synopsis 
Nancy Dodge, a student at an all-girls school, is in love with Dickie Stewart, the brother of her classmate, Polly. However, Nancy's uncle, George Winthrop Gordon, wants her to marry Phillip Campbell. Although Phillip is actually in love with a widow, Anne Merton, he and Nancy agree to marry. However, the two also agree that their marriage is one of convenience, and they can pursue other people. During a masked ball, Nancy and Phillip realize that they do actually love each other, and Dickie leaves with Anne.

Cast

External links 

 Apple Blossoms at the IDBD

References 

1919 musicals
Broadway musicals
English-language operettas
Fred Astaire
Musicals based on books